Avishkaar is a 1974 Hindi movie. Produced and directed by Basu Bhattacharya, the film stars Rajesh Khanna and Sharmila Tagore. The film was the part of Basu Battacharya's introspective trilogy on marital discord in an urban setting, which included Anubhav (1971) and Griha Pravesh (1979) The movie was critically acclaimed with critics giving it five out of five stars in the Bollywood guide Collections. The review by the newspaper Hindu quoted "Here you can see Khanna inhabiting a disillusioned husband with all the details. There is nothing trademark 'Kaka' here as you only see Amar with all his frailties come alive on the screen. It must have being challenging for the raging star to pick a role where he was not the hero in the conventional sense." The film was a box office hit. Khanna waived 70% of his remuneration to star in this project.

The critics from the Internet site 'Scroll.in' quoted  "Aavishkar is indisputably Rajesh Khanna's film. Through a fog of cigarette smoke, Amar's fixed gaze communicates the dullness of fatigue after the shattering of his inner world. When he speaks, his voice is low, and in two confrontational flashbacks with his hostile father-in-law, Khanna's performance peaks. The superstar's superb performance in Basu Bhattacharya's domestic drama proves his unexplored talent at stasis."

Cast
Rajesh Khanna ...as Amar
Sharmila Tagore ...as Mansi
Dina Pathak ...as taxi driver's wife
Dennis Clement ... Dennis Clement		
Monika Jashnani ... Child artist
 Devendra Khandelwal...as Sunil		
 Mahesh Sharma		
 Minna Johar ... as Rita
Satyen Kappu ...as Taxi driver

Synopsis
Amar and Mansi are in love, and decide to get married. They do so, and still continue to be in love. They get to their first wedding anniversary, and decide to hire a taxi-cab for a day, just to drive around and have fun. Thereafter, to their joy they are blessed with a child. But then their bliss is cut short, when Amar starts work with his advertising agency, which grooms beautiful young women, to further their careers as models, and both cannot stand each other anymore.

Plot
Amar (Rajesh Khanna) works in an Ad Agency, One night when he is alone in his office, Rita one of the staff walks in and invites him to join her for a movie. Back home, Mansi (Sharmila Tagore) is at home with her child and Margarette, the maid. Sunil, Amar's childhood friend comes home with flowers and wishes her a happy anniversary. It's Amar's and Mansi's wedding anniversary and they don't remember it themselves.

They think of their carefree days when they were madly in love with each other, when nothing seemed impossible. They start off with an ideal marriage; their small world is brimming with love and is perfect. A whole year and they are still happy with each other. On their second anniversary they decide it's time to extend their family and plan to have a child.

Amar starts finding fault in everything that Mansi does even suspecting that there's something going on between Mansi and Sunil. Mansi also knows about Rita. Amar wishes Mansi was as understanding as Rita. But though there are problems they sort them out.

Mansi gets up the following morning when the milkman comes. And when she goes out she sees the flowers that Amar had left outside the previous night. Amar comes from behind and sees her pick them up, he hugs her and they walk in together.

Soundtrack
All songs were composed by Kanu Roy.

Awards
Filmfare Best Actor Award for Rajesh Khanna. WON

Critical reception

Avishkaar is featured in Avijit Ghosh's book, 40 Retakes: Bollywood Classics You May Have Missed.

References

External links 
 

1974 films
1970s Hindi-language films
Films directed by Basu Bhattacharya
Films scored by Kanu Roy